Angustinaripterus was a basal pterosaur, belonging to the breviquartossan family Rhamphorhynchidae (more specifically within the subfamily Rhamphorhynchinae) and  discovered at Dashanpu near Zigong in the Sichuan province of China.

Discovery and etymology
 
Angustinaripterus was named in 1983 by He Xinlu. The type species is Angustinaripterus longicephalus. The genus name is derived from Latin angustus, "narrow" and naris, "nostril", combined with Latinized Greek pteron, "wing". The specific name is derived from Latin longus, "long", and Greek kephale, "head".

The holotype, ZDM T8001, is a single skull with lower jaws, found in 1981 by researchers from the Zigong Historical Museum of the Salt Industry, in the Xiashaximiao Formation (Bathonian).

Description
The skull of Angustinaripterus, of which the left side is severely damaged, is very elongated and flat. The nares are long, slit-like and positioned above and in front of the large skull openings, the fenestrae antorbitales, with which they are not confluent. Of the jaws, which are very straight, the front part is lacking. There are six pairs of teeth in the maxillae and three pairs in the premaxillae. In the mandible there are at least ten pairs of teeth, perhaps twelve. The back teeth are small, the front teeth are very long, robust and curved, pointing moderately forward. At the front they form a large, intermeshing "prey grab", that may have been used to snatch fish from the water surface. The teeth of Angustinaripterus resemble those of Dorygnathus.

Classification
Xinlu placed Angustinaripterus into the family Rhamphorhynchidae. Because of the derived morphology and the large geographical distance with comparable European forms He also created a special subfamily  Angustinaripterinae, of which  Angustinaripterus itself is the only known member; because of this redundancy the concept is rarely used. He concluded that Angustinaripterus was directly related to the Scaphognathinae. David Unwin however, considers it a member of the other rhamphorhynchid subgroup: the Rhamphorhynchinae.

The cladogram (family tree) below is a phylogenetic analysis published by the paleontologists Brian Andres & Timothy Myers in 2013. They recovered Angustinaripterus as derived rhamphorhynchine, within the tribe Angustinaripterini, sister taxon to Sericipterus.

See also
 Timeline of pterosaur research
 List of pterosaurs

References

The Pterosaur Database (pdf)

Literature
He, Xinlu; Yang, Daihuan; & Su, Chunkang, 1983, "A New Pterosaur from the Middle Jurassic of Dashanpu, Zigong, Sichuan", Journal of the Chengdu College of Geology supplement 1, pp. 27–33 [title in 1991 English translation by Will Downs]

Middle Jurassic pterosaurs of Asia
Rhamphorhynchids
Fossil taxa described in 1983